
Year 693 (DCXCIII) was a common year starting on Wednesday (link will display the full calendar) of the Julian calendar. The denomination 693 for this year has been used since the early medieval period, when the Anno Domini calendar era became the prevalent method in Europe for naming years.

Events 
 By place 
 Europe 
 Sisebert, archbishop of Toledo, leads a rebellion against King Ergica of the Visigoths. He plans to assassinate Ergica and his wife Liuvigoto but fails, and is defrocked and excommunicated.
 April 25 – Sixteenth Council of Toledo: Ergica calls for a council of the church to deal with the security of the kingship. The rebels are anathematised and the Forum ludicum is modified. 

 Britain 
 King Oshere of Hwicce (sub-kingdom of Mercia) dies after a 13-year reign. He is succeeded by his four sons as apparent joint-kings: Æthelberht, Æthelheard, Æthelweard and Æthelric. 
 King Ine of Wessex establishes his West Saxon "Law of Codes", to regain authority in his kingdom. He consolidates Wessex's territory in the western peninsula (approximate date).

 Central America 
May 31 – Kʼakʼ Tiliw Chan Chaak is installed as the new ruler of the Mayan city state of Naranjo in Guatemala at the age of 5-years-old, under the regency of his mother, Wak Chanil Ajaw (Lady Six Sky) of Dos Pilas, and reigns until his death in 720.

By topic
 Religion 
 Earconwald, bishop of London, dies and is succeeded by Waldhere. He is buried at St. Paul's Cathedral, and later revered as a saint.
 Wulfram of Sens attends the assembly of bishops at Valenciennes (Northern France).
 Callinicus I becomes the 71st patriarch of Constantinople, after Paul III.

Births 
 Alfonso I, king of Asturias (approximate date)

Deaths 
 Begga, Frankish abbess (b. 615)
 Bridei III, king of the Picts
 Earconwald, bishop of London
 Fáelchar ua Máele Ódrain, king of Osraige (Ireland)
 Oshere, king of Hwicce (Mercia)
 Paul III, patriarch of Constantinople

References

Sources